Cathkin is a former railway station in Cathkin, Victoria, Australia. The last passenger service was on 28 May 1977.

References

Railway stations in Australia opened in 1890
Railway stations closed in 1978
Disused railway stations in Victoria (Australia)
Mansfield railway line